Spottsville is a census-designated place (CDP) and former coal town in Henderson County, Kentucky, United States. As of the 2010 census the population was 325.

U.S. Route 60 forms the northern edge of Spottsville, and the Green River forms the eastern edge. The Green River Lock & Dam is located in the community. If one travels east through Spottsville, one can see the lock to one's right when one crosses the US-60 bridge (the Green River Bridge). One can still see some of the remains of the old locks that were replaced in the mid-1960s; to one's left, one can see a turning bridge for trains (it turns when a barge comes through).

US-60 leads east  to Owensboro and west  to Henderson, the Henderson County seat.

There is one elementary school in Spottsville, serving all of the eastern part of Henderson County (including Beals, Baskett, and Reed). The original Spottsville school, which served all grades, provided Henderson County's first school bus service in 1920. This original Spottsville school burned down in March 1932.

Spottsville was named for Major Samuel Spotts, who shot the first gun at the Battle of New Orleans. The area was visited by the Spanish explorer Hernando de Soto in 1541. His army was attacked near the Ohio River by Indians of a tribe or tribes called variously the Kashinampo, the Quizqui, and the Chiska Cherokee.

From 1904 to 1911 as many as 116 men of the Green River Coal Company mined coal in Spottsville. The Pittsburgh Coal Company operated a 75-man coal camp in Spottsville from 1911 to 1924.

Demographics

References

External links 
An unofficial Spottsville website

Census-designated places in Henderson County, Kentucky
Coal towns in Kentucky
Census-designated places in Kentucky